Nils Erik Mattias Bjärsmyr (born 3 January 1986) is a Swedish former professional footballer who played as a centre-back. Beginning his professional career with IFK Göteborg in 2005, he went on to play in Greece, Norway, and Turkey before retiring at IFK Göteborg in 2022. A full international between 2008 and 2009, he won three caps for the Sweden national team.

Club career
After playing for a local club, Grimsås IF, and Husqvarna FF, Bjärsmyr joined IFK Göteborg in 2005. He made his first appearance for IFK Göteborg on 30 May 2005 as the club took on IF Elfsborg. He became a regular starter later in the year and was nominated best newcomer at the Swedish national football gala. On 15 July 2009, he signed a four-year contract for Panathinaikos in Super League Greece. On 29 Augusti 2012, he returned to IFK Göteborg. He had another stint abroad in Turkey between 2017 and 2020 before retiring at IFK Göteborg in 2022.

International career
Bjärsmyr featured three times for the senior team. He made his debut for the Swedish national team on 13 January 2008 against Costa Rica. Bjärsmyr has previously served as the captain for Sweden U21 team, and he also captained Sweden's U21 team that competed in the 2009 UEFA European Under-21 Championship.

Career statistics

Club

International

Honours
Husqvarna FF
Division 2 Östra Götaland: 2002, 2004

IFK Göteborg
Allsvenskan: 2007
Svenska Cupen: 2008, 2012–13, 2014–15, 2019–20
Svenska Supercupen: 2008

Panathinaikos
Superleague Greece: 2009–10
Greek Football Cup: 2009–10

Rosenborg
Tippeligaen: 2010

References

External links

IFK Göteborg profile

1986 births
Living people
Swedish footballers
Swedish expatriate footballers
People from Gislaved Municipality
IFK Göteborg players
Panathinaikos F.C. players
Rosenborg BK players
Husqvarna FF players
Gençlerbirliği S.K. footballers
Sivasspor footballers
Allsvenskan players
Super League Greece players
Eliteserien players
Süper Lig players
Association football defenders
Sweden international footballers
Sweden youth international footballers
Sweden under-21 international footballers
Expatriate footballers in Greece
Expatriate footballers in Norway
Expatriate footballers in Turkey
Swedish expatriate sportspeople in Greece
Swedish expatriate sportspeople in Norway
Swedish expatriate sportspeople in Turkey
Sportspeople from Jönköping County